Percy Faith (April 7, 1908 – February 9, 1976) was a Canadian-American  bandleader, orchestrator, composer and conductor, known for his lush arrangements of instrumental ballads and Christmas standards. He is often credited with popularizing the "easy listening" or "mood music" format. He became a staple of American popular music in the 1950s and continued well into the 1960s. Though his professional orchestra-leading career began at the height of the Swing Era, he refined and rethought orchestration techniques, including use of large string sections, to soften and fill out the brass-dominated popular music of the 1940s.

Biography
Faith was born and raised in Toronto, Ontario, Canada. He was the oldest of eight children. His parents, Abraham Faith and Minnie, née Rottenberg, were Jewish. He played violin and piano as a child, and played in theatres and at Massey Hall. After his hands were badly burned in a fire, he turned to conducting, and his live orchestras used the new medium of radio broadcasting. He moved from Canada to Great Neck, New York and became a U.S. citizen.

Beginning with stations CKNC and CKCL, Faith was a staple of the Canadian Broadcasting Corporation's live-music broadcasting from 1933 to 1940, when he resettled in Chicago, Illinois. In the early 1940s, Faith was orchestra leader for the Carnation Contented program on NBC. From 1948 to 1949 he also served as the orchestra leader on the CBS radio network program The Coca-Cola Hour (also called The Pause That Refreshes). The orchestral accordionist John Serry Sr. collaborated with Faith in these broadcasts.

In 1945, he became a naturalized citizen of the United States. He made many recordings for Voice of America. After working briefly for Decca Records, he worked for Mitch Miller at Columbia Records, where he turned out dozens of albums and provided arrangements for many of the pop singers of the 1950s, including Tony Bennett, Doris Day, Johnny Mathis for Mathis's 1958 Christmas album titled Merry Christmas, and Guy Mitchell for whom Faith co-wrote with Carl Sigman Mitchell's number-one single, "My Heart Cries for You".

His most famous and remembered recordings are "Delicado" (1952), "The Song from Moulin Rouge" (1953) and "Theme from A Summer Place" (1959), which won the Grammy Award for Record of the Year in 1961. Faith remains the only artist to have the best selling single of the year during both the pop singer era ("Song from Moulin Rouge") and the rock era ("Theme from A Summer Place"); and he is one of only three artists, along with Elvis Presley and The Beatles, to have the best selling single of the year twice. The B-side of "Song from the Moulin Rouge" was "Swedish Rhapsody" by Hugo Alfvén. In 1961 his fame in Sweden rose exponentially as his work Mucho Gusto became the theme music for the sports broadcasts of Sveriges Radio.

Though Faith initially mined the worlds of Broadway, Hollywood and Latin music for many of his top-selling 1950s recordings, he enjoyed popularity starting in 1962 with his orchestral versions of popular rock and pop hits of the day. His Themes for Young Lovers album was a top seller during this era and introduced the Faith sound to a younger generation of listeners. With the success of Columbia record-mate Ray Conniff's chorus and orchestra during this same time, Faith began using a chorus (usually all female in most of his recordings, but used a mixed chorus on his albums Leaving on a Jet Plane and I Think I Love You, which were released in 1970 and 1971 respectively) in several popular albums from the mid-1960s on. Faith's first single with a female chorus, "Yellow Days," was a substantial hit in the MOR (Middle of the Road) easy listening radio format of the mid-1960s. Faith continued to enjoy airplay and consistent album sales throughout the early 1970s, and received a second Grammy award in 1969 for his album Love Theme from 'Romeo and Juliet'.

Though best known for his recording career, Faith also occasionally scored motion pictures, and received an Academy Award nomination for his adaptation of the song score for the Doris Day musical feature, Love Me or Leave Me. His other film scores included romantic comedies and dramatic features such as Tammy Tell Me True (1961), I'd Rather Be Rich (1964), The Third Day (1965) and The Oscar (1966). Faith also composed the theme for the NBC series The Virginian.

With the advent of harder rock sounds in the 1970s, Faith's elegant arrangements fell out of favour with the listening and record-buying public, although he continued to release albums as diverse and contemporary as Jesus Christ Superstar and Black Magic Woman. He released one album of country music and two albums of disco-oriented arrangements toward the end of his forty-year career, his last recording being a disco-style reworking of "Theme from a Summer Place", titled "Summer Place '76", which was a minor and posthumous hit. Faith died of cancer in Encino, California, and was interred in the Hillside Memorial Park Cemetery in Culver City, California.

Faith had two children, Marilyn and Peter, with his wife Mary (née Palange), whom he married in 1928. She died in Los Angeles in 1997.

Discography

Albums
Percy Faith placed 21 albums on the Billboard Hot 200 best sellers chart through 1972, making him one of the more successful easy listening acts sales wise. 1963's Themes for Young Lovers was by far his biggest seller, peaking at No. 32 on the chart and followed by three sequel albums "for young lovers".

Singles
Faith produced the following singles:
I Cross My Fingers {Vocal: Russ Emery} US #20, 1950
All My Love (US #7, 1950)
Christmas in Killarney {Vocals: Shillelagh Singers} US #28 – December 1950
On Top of Old Smokey {Vocals: Burl Ives} US #10, 1951
When the Saints Go Marching In / (US #29 – September 1951)
I Want to Be Near You (US #30 – September 1951)
Delicado (US #1, 1952)
Swedish Rhapsody (Midsummer Vigil) / (US #21, 1953)
Moulin Rouge Theme {Vocals: Felicia Sanders} US #1, 1953
Return to Paradise (US #19 – June 1953)
Many Times (US #30 – December 1953)
Dream, Dream, Dream (US #25 – May 1954)
The Bandit (US #25 – October 1954)
Valley Valparaiso (US #53, 1956)
We All Need Love (US #67, 1956)
With a Little Bit of Luck (US #82, 1956)
Till (US #63, 1957)
Theme from A Summer Place (US #1, 1960)
Theme for Young Lovers (US #35, 1960)
Theme from "The Dark at the Top of the Stairs" (US #101 – November 1960)
Sons and Lovers (US #111 – September 1963)
The Sound of Surf (US #111 – September 1963)
Yellow Days (AC #13, 1967)
Can't Take My Eyes Off You (AC #24, 1967)
For Those in Love (1968)
Zorba (AC #36, 1969)
Theme from A Summer Place (instrumental) US #111 – July 1969 – AC #26, 1969
The April Fools (1969)
Airport Love Theme (1970)
Everything's All Right (AC #31 – February 1971)
Theme from Summer of '42 (1971)
Bach's Lunch (1972)
Crunchy Granola Suite (AC #16, 1973)
Hill Where the Lord Hides (AC #44, 1974)
Theme from "Chinatown" (AC #35, 1974)
Summer Place '76 (AC #13, 1976)

References

External links

All About Percy Faith, discography and reference
Percy Faith Pages
Alan Bunting, "Percy Faith Discography"
Percy Faith discography, general information (Music City)
Brief biography
 

1908 births
1976 deaths
20th-century American composers
20th-century American Jews
20th-century American male musicians
20th-century Canadian composers
20th-century Canadian Jews
American conductors (music)
American male composers
American male conductors (music)
American music arrangers
Burials at Hillside Memorial Park Cemetery
Canadian bandleaders
Canadian conductors (music)
Canadian emigrants to the United States
Canadian male composers
Canadian music arrangers
Columbia Records artists
Deaths from cancer in California
Easy listening musicians
Grammy Award winners
Jewish Canadian musicians
Jewish composers
Male conductors (music)
Musicians from Toronto
Orchestra leaders